Gowdy universes or, alternatively, Gowdy solutions of Einstein's equations are simple model spacetimes in general relativity which represent an expanding universe filled with a regular pattern of gravitational waves.

External links

 – a description of the different types of Gowdy universes suitable for a general audience

General relativity